The Scranton Miners, known as the Scranton Apollos from 1970 to 1977, were a professional basketball team based in Scranton, Pennsylvania that was a member of the American Basketball League and the Eastern Basketball Association.  Arthur Pachter was the owner and coach for many years.

The team was previously known as the Jersey City Atoms before moving to Scranton in 1946.  They played in the ABL until 1953.  After a two-year hiatus, they were resurrected in the middle of the 1954-55 season in the Eastern Professional Basketball League as a replacement for the Carbondale Celtics.  For many years the team was owned by local businessman, Art Pachter, and played games at the Scranton CYC building.  During its brief existence the team won two championships, led by Syracuse University alum Jim Boeheim (who later became its head coach).  They were renamed the Scranton Apollos in 1970, and folded in 1977.

In June 1963, Scranton Miners owner Arthur Pachter announced the team had signed Paul Seymour to a one-year contract as head coach. The details of the contract were not disclosed, but Pachter told the Associated Press, "[it is] unquestionably the highest ever paid to a coach in the Eastern Basketball Association." Scranton hosted the 1969 Eastern Basketball Association (EBA) All-Star Game. The league also held the 1971 EBA All-Star Game on February 17 in Scranton at the Scranton CYC Building. On January 25, 1976, Scranton Apollos player Charlie Criss set an EBA record for points scored in a game with 72.

The Scranton Miners were resurrected in 1993 by an investment group led by attorneys George Daniel and Anthony Daniel. The Miners were charter members of the Atlantic Basketball Association and again played at the Scranton CYC for 3 seasons   The Miners captured the league's regular season title in 1993-94 and in 1994-95.  The Miners defeated the Trenton Flames to win the 1994-95 ABA championship. The franchise was sold and moved to Connecticut following the 1995-96 season.

Year-by-year

References

Sports in the Scranton–Wilkes-Barre metropolitan area
Defunct basketball teams in Pennsylvania
Scranton, Pennsylvania
American Basketball League (1925–1955) teams
Basketball teams established in 1947
1977 disestablishments in Pennsylvania
Basketball teams disestablished in 1977
1947 establishments in Pennsylvania